Abd Allah ibn al-Hakam al-Tujibi was the last member of the Banu Tujib to rule the Taifa of Zaragoza before they were muscled out of control by the Banu Hud family. He ruled briefly in 1039 before the Banu Hud seized control.

References
 List of Muslim rulers

Emirs of Zaragoza
11th-century rulers in Al-Andalus
Year of birth unknown
Year of death unknown
11th-century Arabs